Adrada de Haza is a municipality and town located in the province of Burgos, Castile and León, Spain. 
According to the 2004 census (INE), the municipality had a population of 260 inhabitants.

References 

Municipalities in the Province of Burgos